St. Mary's Institute of O'Fallon, also known as the Motherhouse for the Congregation of the Sisters of the Adoration of the Most Precious Blood, is a historic convent, school, and national historic district located at O'Fallon, St. Charles County, Missouri. The district encompasses 11 contributing buildings and 1 contributing site (a cemetery). The main building is the three-story, Gothic Revival style motherhouse.  Its original section was built in 1874, with a series of interconnected wings dating from 1874 through 1997 making for a complex, irregular plan building.  The building includes the convent, two chapels, academy, novitiate, dining room, kitchen, gym, and infirmary.  A part of the building houses the O'Fallon City Hall.

It was added to the National Register of Historic Places in 2007.

References

Historic districts on the National Register of Historic Places in Missouri
Properties of religious function on the National Register of Historic Places in Missouri
Gothic Revival architecture in Missouri
Colonial Revival architecture in Missouri
Religious buildings and structures completed in 1874
Buildings and structures in St. Charles County, Missouri
National Register of Historic Places in St. Charles County, Missouri
1874 establishments in Missouri
Tourist attractions in St. Louis